Baharijodon is an extinct genus of trematochampsid crocodylomorph. Fossils have been found that date back to the Cenomanian stage of the Late Cretaceous.

References

External links
 Baharijodon in the Paleobiology Database

Late Cretaceous crocodylomorphs of Africa
Extinct animals of Africa
Prehistoric pseudosuchian genera